Baghramyan is a village in the Armavir Province of Armenia. It is named after the Soviet Armenian military commander and Marshal of the Soviet Union Ivan Bagramyan.

Notable people
 Arakel Mirzoyan, European champion in weightlifting

References 

World Gazeteer: Armenia – World-Gazetteer.com

Populated places in Armavir Province
Populated places established in 1947
Cities and towns built in the Soviet Union
1947 establishments in the Soviet Union